Istigol (also Romanized as Īstīgol; also known as Īstī Qol) is a village in Anguran Rural District, Anguran District, Mahneshan County, Zanjan Province, Iran. At the 2006 census, its population was 81, in 23 families.

References 

Populated places in Mahneshan County